Wilver Eduardo Jiménez (born 16 March 1990) is a Venezuelan footballer who plays as a goalkeeper for Venezuelan Primera División club LALA FC.

Career

Atlético Venezuela
Jiménez was introduced to the club through a tryout in his hometown of Caracas, attended by then-head coach José Hernández. He impressed Hernández and was offered a contract, making his debut for the club in May 2012 against Policía de Lara.

References

External links

1990 births
Living people
Atlético Venezuela C.F. players
Margarita F.C. players
Venezuelan Primera División players
Venezuelan footballers
Association football goalkeepers